The  Village Pump Festival is a folk music festival that takes place near Trowbridge, England. It has its roots  years ago in a barn at the Lamb Inn, Trowbridge, and later moved a few miles outside the town to Stowford Manor Farm at Farleigh Hungerford. The music covers a variety of genres from folk and roots to blues, celtic and Ceilidh with a variety of other entertainment including a family field, with puppetry and story telling.

Background
The event arose from the folk club of the same name founded in Trowbridge in 1970 and the annual festival held there until 1984, when it moved to Stowford Manor Farm.

Prior to 2010, all events took place in marquees and the compact site includes camping, car parking, three separate stages plus children's tent, two beer tents and a myriad of trade stalls selling items from all over the world.  2010 saw the introduction of an outdoor main stage (the Moonshine Stage), with two marquees (the Horizon and Old Rosie Stages), and several additional small stages and undercover performance areas.

History

The folk club of the same name was founded by Pat Drinkwater in 1970 in a former storeroom at the rear of The Lamb pub in Mortimer Street, Trowbridge. Early performers included Maddy Prior and Tim Hart, Keith Christmas, Dick Gaughan and Stéphane Grappelli. Many others later played there.

The first festival was held in 1974 before moving to Stowford Farm, Farleigh Hungerford, in 1980, under the direction of Alan Briars and Dave Newman. Newman died in 2005 and Briars in 2007.

In 2006 a group of enthusiasts relaunched the Village Pump folk club at The Lamb.

The 2011 event was called off, the first time this had happened, because of difficulties in obtaining ticket revenues from the online transaction company.  Trowbridge Village Pump Festival Limited, the company that ran the festival, did not find out until late January 2010 that the online transaction provider had sold on that part of their business to another company. The new owner viewed festivals as very risky and applied conditions to the release of the ticket revenue, i.e. the monies would not be released until three months after the festival. It was by that time too late move to another provider, and the company shareholders voted to suspend the event.

Many of the original members decided to resurrect the festival under a new name. The 2012 Village Pump Folk Festival took place at White Horse Country Park, Westbury on 20–22 July 2012 with Show of Hands as festival patrons. It was covered by FromeFM.

Following disappointing ticket sales in 2015 and 2016, the organisers decided to take the Village Pump Folk Festival into voluntary liquidation. The 2017 festival was initially cancelled, but later a smaller festival was planned.

Another group of volunteers, including several previous committee members, organised a 2018 festival at Stowford Manor Farm. In 2019 the organisation was unable to meet Wiltshire Council's requirements for the event licence, and in 2020 the festival could not be held due to the COVID-19 pandemic.

2010 line up 
Moonshine Main Stage:

2009 line up

2008 line up

2007 line up

2006 line up

2005 line up

2004 line up

Gallery

References

External links 

 

Music festivals in Somerset
Music festivals in Wiltshire
Folk festivals in the United Kingdom
Music festivals established in 1973
Trowbridge
1973 establishments in England